Deraz Zamin (also Romanized as Derāz Zamīn; also known as Derāz Zamīnak) is a village in Jennat Rudbar Rural District, in the Central District of Ramsar County, Mazandaran Province, Iran. At the 2006 census, its population was 18, in 7 families.

References 

Populated places in Ramsar County